Funlola Aofiyebi-Raimi, born Abibat Oluwafunmilola Aofiyebi and known informally as FAR, is a Nigerian actress. She has had a long-running radio show.
She appeared in the film The Figurine, Tinsel, and MTV Shuga.

Life
Funlola is the last of seven children, born to a businesswoman mother and an entrepreneur father. The name FAR came after she got married and has become her signature. FAR had an early start on stage and television, with her aunt Teni Aofiyebi, a veteran actress. She is married to advertising guru Olayinka Raimi. Due to the death of her brother she decided to stay off social media for some time and later return.

Career
FAR took a TV acting course at Westminster College, and at the Actors Studio in Buckinghamshire. She also has a BSc in sociology from the University of Lagos in Nigeria.
FAR's film debut was in Amaka Igwe's film Violated acting alongside Joke Silva, Richard Mofe Damijo, Ego Boyo , and Kunle Bamtefa. She was nominated for a THEMA best upcoming actress award in 1996. FAR was cast as the lead character in Keeping Faith, by director Steve Gukas. FAR was nominated for an AMMA best supporting actress award for The Figurine directed by Kunle Afolayan.  Before appearing in the M-net TV show Tinsel, playing Brenda, FAR has featured on other drama shows like Doctors Quarters, Solitaire, and Palace. FAR has acted on stage in Sing That Old Song For Me and The Mansion written by Rasheed Badamusi, and also The Vagina Monologues. 
FAR won a dance reality show called Celebrity Takes 2. In 2014, FAR co-starred with  British-Nigerian actor Wale Ojo.

She had a radio show called Touch of Spice for 14 years (started in August 1999).

FAR was in MTV Shuga in 2019 and 2020 and her supporting role of "Mrs Olutu" was included when it went into a mini-series titled MTV Shuga Alone Together highlighting the problems of Coronavirus on 20 April 2020. The series was written by Tunde Aladese and broadcast every week night - its backers include the United Nations. The series was based in Nigeria, South Africa, Kenya and Côte d'Ivoire and the story progresses using on-line conversations on location between the characters. All of the filming was done by the actors who include Lerato Walaza, Mamarumo Marokane, Jemima Osunde, Folu Storms and FAR.

In August 2009, she celebrated the 10 years anniversary of her radio program Touch of Spice(TOS). She promised to do it in grand style by making available a free train trip for her fans to go watch a movie at the cinema.

Her longest running appearance on television is on the Pan African Network MNet daily soap - Tinsel, where she has for 10 seasons played the role as Brenda Mensah - nominated at the 2010 Nigerian Entertainment Awards, New York (NEA) for Best Actress in a TV Show.
A dance enthusiast, Funlola won the maiden edition of a dance reality show, Celebrity Takes 2 in 2007, beating 9 other Nigerian Celebrities to the top spot. 
She attends Film Festivals on a regular basis and has been contracted as a goodwill ambassador for both Black Star International Film Festival (Ghana) and Real Time Film Festival (Nigeria).

Filmography
The Figurine (2009)
Tinsel (2008–Present)
Grey Dawn (film) (2015)
Entreat (2016)
Walking with Shadows (2019)

Awards

References

External links

Living people
University of Lagos alumni
Yoruba actresses
Place of birth missing (living people)
21st-century Nigerian actresses
Nigerian television actresses
Nigerian stage actresses
Nigerian film actresses
Alumni of the University of Westminster
Nigerian radio presenters
Nigerian women radio presenters
Actresses from Lagos State
1970 births